Portet-sur-Garonne (literally Portet on Garonne; Languedocien: Portèth de Garona) is a commune in the Haute-Garonne department in southwestern France. Portet-Saint-Simon station has rail connections to Foix, Tarbes, and Toulouse, which is the nearest big city, about 10km away.

Population

The inhabitants of the commune are known as Portésiens in French.

See also
Camp du Récébédou
Communes of the Haute-Garonne department

References

Communes of Haute-Garonne